The 2022 MAMA Awards ceremony, organized by CJ E&M and broadcast through its music channel Mnet, was broadcast live on November 29 and 30, 2022. The ceremony was held at the Kyocera Dome Osaka, Japan. The theme for the ceremony is titled "K-POP World Citizenship" with sub-themes per night, "The world we build together" for day 1, and "We are K-POP" for day 2. The ceremony is the first to carry the new rebranded name, the first to take place overseas during the COVID-19 pandemic, and the 24th in the show's history.

This year's ceremony saw the addition of the MAMA Platinum award which will be given to artists who've won all 4 daesangs (Grand Prizes). BTS was the first, and so far only, artist to receive the award, by virtue of winning all of the four daesangs in the previous 3 editions.

Background
On August 23, 2022, CJ E&M announced that the "Mnet Asian Music Awards" would be rebranded as simply the "MAMA Awards" going forward. On October 26, Mnet announced the first line up of artists for the ceremony. On November 9, Mnet announced the second line up of artists for the ceremony. On November 16, Mnet announced the hosts of the ceremony, Jeon Somi will be hosting day 1 while Park Bo-gum will host day 2. They also announced that BTS member, J-hope, will perform. Collaboration stages are also announced.

Performers

Day 1

Day 2

Presenters

Day 1 

 Ahn Hyun-mo, Nam Yoon-su and Gabee – Red Carpet Hosts
 Joo Jung-hyuk – Worldwide Fans' Choice Top 10
 Kang Han-na – Favorite New Artist and Worldwide Fans' Choice Top 10 
 Kwak Yoon-gy and Gabee – Yogibo Chill Artist Award
 Nam Yoon-su and Mio Imada – Worldwide Fans' Choice Top 10 and Favorite New Artist
 Park Sung-hoon – Favorite New Artist and Worldwide Fans' Choice Top 10
 Pak Se-ri – Favorite Asian Artist and Worldwide Fans' Choice Top 10
 Lee Jae-wook – Favorite New Artist and Worldwide Fans' Choice Top 10
 Seo Ji-hye – Worldwide Fans' Choice Top 10
 Park Bo-gum – Yogibo Worldwide Icon of the Year

Day 2 

 Ahn Hyun-mo, Nam Yoon-su and Aiki – Red Carpet Hosts
 Enhypen – Best New Male Artist
 Yeo Jin-goo – Inspiring Achievement
 Woo Do-hwan and Han Sun-hwa – Best Male Artist and Best Female Artist
 Nam Yoon-su and Aiki – Global Music Trend Leader
 Moon Ga-young – Breakout Producer
 Yeo Jin-goo and Kim So-hyun – Most Popular Male Artist
 Kim Hae-joon and Lee Eun-ji – Best Dance Performance Female Group
 Hwang Min-hyun and Ahn So-hee – Favorite Female Group and Best Dance Performance Male Group
 Kentaro Sakaguchi – Yogibo Album of the Year
 Jung Woo-sung – Yogibo Song of the Year
 Yuna Kim – Yogibo Artist of the Year
 Hwang Jung-min – MAMA Platinum

Criteria 
All songs that have been released from November 1, 2021, to October 21, 2022, are eligible to be nominated.

On November 9, 2022, Mnet announced that due to the changes in Twitter which makes securing and collecting data impossible, they will remove all Twitter votes from the Worldwide Icon of the Year and Worldwide Fan's Choice category without making adjustments to the other sources.

Winners and nominees
Winners and nominees are listed in alphabetical order. Winners listed first and highlighted in bold.

The nominees were announced during the live announcement last October 24, 2022 at 6PM KST. Voting opened an hour after.

Main awards

Favorite awards

Special awards

Professional Categories

Multiple awards 
The following artist(s) received three or more awards:

Broadcast 
The ceremony of the 2022 MAMA Awards will be broadcast live worldwide from Mnet in South Korea, to simulcast across CJ E&M channels (where available); other international networks, and online via Mnet K-pop, Mnet TV, M2, and KCON's YouTube account. The red carpet will be broadcast live 2 hours before the main ceremony.

Notes

References

External links
 

2022 in South Korean music
Mnet
MAMA Awards ceremonies
November 2022 events in South Korea